Manuel Kerhe (born 3 June 1987) is an Austrian footballer who plays for SV Ried II.

References

Austrian footballers
1987 births
Living people
SV Bad Aussee players
SV Grödig players
Wolfsberger AC players
LASK players
SV Ried players
Austrian Football Bundesliga players
2. Liga (Austria) players
Austrian Regionalliga players
Association football defenders
People from Sankt Veit an der Glan
Footballers from Carinthia (state)